"Say It Loud" is the eighth, season finale and series finale episode of the second season of Noah's Arc. It was originally aired on October 4, 2006 on Logo.

Plot
After being gay bashed at a gas station and eventually reconciles with Wade romantically, Noah hears the news that Dre is planning to propose marriage to Wade at the Black Gay Pride beach party.  Unable to reach Wade by phone, Noah runs into him at his work, asking why he has not returned any of his calls. Wade responded that they both cheated on their boyfriends, and they need to commit to their relationship and go on their separate ways.  At the Ovahness Ball, Noah breaks up with Quincy, realizing that he is still in love with Wade and Quincy was not "the one".  At the beach party, Noah meets up with Wade in the restroom, telling him that he still loves him. Noah also tells Wade that Dre is proposing marriage. Noah gives Wade an ultimatum to tell him in his eyes to leave him forever so they can never see each other again; however, they both kiss and go in a bathroom stall. After they both came out of it, Dre was in the bathroom and saw the two of them kiss.

Trey is having his photos taken for calendars to be sold for raising money towards Alex's HIV/AIDS clinic. At the Ovahness Ball, overzealous buyers for the calendars are trying to get a piece of Trey after the calendars went out of stock. Trey tells Alex that they won't be going to the Black Gay Pride beach party. They end up staying home babysitting Chance and Eddie's child, Kenya. While babysitting Kenya, they decide to have a child of their own.

Ricky and Junito decide to have an open relationship. Ricky is anxious about Junito not taking advantage of seeing other people, so he sets him up with another male companion, whom they become good acquaintances. At the beach party, Ricky sees the two share a kiss at the beach party, which upsets him. When Junito finds him, Ricky claims that he is in a "prison" with their relationship, and Junito breaks it up for good.

Chance and Eddie are looking forward to the Black Gay Pride. At Ricky's clothing store, Chance spots the very same swimsuit that he wore when he met Eddie. He buys and wears it which surprises Eddie in a good way. They reconciled about the old days of their relationship, one of which they had sex in a car. Eddie later decides to leave the party but lets Chance stay at the beach. Alex meets up with Chance and Ricky to tell them about his and Trey's decision to have a child. After this, Dre was spotted yelling at Wade about cheating on him with Noah. They get in their car and drive away, and Noah spots Quincy on the side catching on the whole situation.

After the party, the group drive home together, and on the road, they see a car accident involving Wade and Dre. Wade is thrown out of the convertible while Dre is stuck inside the car. Noah and the group tend to Wade as an ambulance arrives.

Cancellation and Aftermath
This episode of Noah's Arc was the last episode that has aired before going into hiatus. Darryl Stephens, who played the character "Noah", declared this episode to be the series finale on his MySpace page. Christian Vincent, who portrayed "Ricky", posted a blog on his MySpace page stating that Season 3 of Noah's Arc was "very unlikely" to happen. The series creator Patrik-Ian Polk has not made any comments regarding the claims from the actors. A blogger from Entertainment Weekly later reported that the show was officially canceled.

In early 2008, the film Noah's Arc: Jumping the Broom was announced, and it would tie up any loose ends within the story arc of the entire series.  The film revolves on Noah and Wade getting married at Martha's Vineyard. In the film, it was mentioned that Noah was nursing Wade back to health following the car accident. There is no mention on whether if Dre had survived the accident. The film was released in select theaters and video on demand on October 24, 2008. As of 2016, it is available for free viewing on Logo TV's website.

References

2006 American television episodes
American television series finales